Trčka (feminine Trčková) is a Czech surname. Notable people with the surname include:

 Adam Erdmann Trčka von Lípa (1599–1634), Bohemian nobleman and lieutenant field marshal of the Thirty Years' War
 Aleš Trčka (born 1961), Czech cyclist
 Anton Josef Trčka (1893–1940), Austrian-born Czech poet and photographer
 Dominik Trcka (1886–1959), Czech Catholic theologist and martyr
 Jayne Trcka (born 1963), American bodybuilder and actress
 Lenny Trčková, Czech TV presenter
 Martin Trčka (born 1977), Czech Olympic sailor

Czech-language surnames